The TOP 1 Ack Attack is a specially constructed land-speed record streamliner motorcycle that, has held the record for world's fastest motorcycle since recording a two-way average speed of  on September 25, 2010 in the Cook Motorsports Top Speed Shootout at Bonneville Speedway, Utah. This was the third time in four years the Ack Attack had broken the motorcycle land-speed record.

The record was confirmed and certified by the Federation Internationale de Motocyclisme (FIM), which is the world's leading regulatory authority for motorcycle  racing. The Ack Attack's record was included in the 2012 Guinness World Records.

Designed and built from the ground up by Mike Akatiff, the Ack Attack's bullet-shaped chassis is made from chromoly tubing. While pursuing the land-speed record, the Ack Attack experienced a number of failed attempts, including runs which ended in spectacular crashes.

History 
The first land-speed record for a motorcycle was unofficially set in the early 1900s by Glenn Curtiss in Yonkers, New York. This record stood for more than 20 years. 

It was not until 1930, in Arpajon, France, that Curtiss's record was officially eclipsed when Joseph S. Wright rode  on his motorcycle. 

From the 1930s through the mid-1950s a number of motorcycle riders pushed their motorcycles to set new land-speed records at different locations (mostly in Europe). By 1956, when riders began to flirt with, and ultimately exceed, the 200-mph mark, the record-setting attempts were taking place at the Bonneville Salt Flats in Utah.

Bonneville has remained the location for record-breaking attempts to this day. A number of motorcycles have taken advantage of the area's fast conditions to push the land-speed record higher and higher. In 1975, Don Vesco became the first rider to set a record exceeding  on his Yamaha motorcycle.

Between 2006 and 2010, the TOP 1 Ack Attack and the BUB Seven streamliner have gone back and forth with the motorcycle land-speed record on five occasions.

In August 2017, Mike Akatiff brought the Ack Attack to the largest salt flats in the world at Salar de Uyuni, Bolivia to attempt another record-breaking run and achieve the team’s goal of becoming the first motorcycle to break the 400-mph barrier. While the team didn't set the record on this attempt, they intend to return to Bolivia in the future for another run at 400 mph and beyond.

Attempts and crashes 
September 2004 – At the International Speed Trials by BUB, the Ack Attack, ridden by Jimmy Odom, was hit by a crosswind while pushing . Odom was uninjured when the motorcycle streamliner crashed in the high-speed wipeout.

February 2006 – The Ack Attack team traveled to the Lake Gairdner area in Australia in an attempt to break the motorcycle land-speed record. With a traveling crew of 23 people, including riders Sam Wheeler and John Noonan, the team arrived at the salt flats near Lake Gairdner only to discover that the conditions were not conducive to breaking the record. The area had been hit by a huge thunderstorm the week before the team arrived.
  
September 2006 – On September 3, 2006, the TOP 1 Ack Attack, ridden by Rocky Robinson, broke the motorcycle land-speed record at the Bonneville Salt Flats. The Ack Attack's record was short-lived however.

September 2007 – Again at the International Speed Trials by BUB, Rocky Robinson rode the Ack Attack through the measured mile in pursuit of reclaiming the motorcycle land-speed record.

September 2008 – Back again at Bonneville, the Ack Attack broke the motorcycle land-speed record for the second time.

September 2010 – The BUB Lucky 7 again reclaimed the motorcycle land-speed record at Bonneville in 2009. Then, on September 25, 2010, the Ack Attack, for the third time in four years, set a new world's record at Bonneville by traveling . Once again, Rocky Robinson was in the rider's seat for another run to reclaim the title.

Mike Akatiff 
Mike Akatiff is the owner of Ack Technologies, an avionics company, and is a motorcycle racer, machinist, mechanic, and parts builder. Akatiff first became interested in setting the motorcycle land-speed record in 2002. He dedicated a large portion of his company facility in Northern California to designing and constructing the Ack Attack, and assembled a team of old friends to help build the motorcycle.

Crew 
 Ken Puccio, Crew Chief, spent many hours welding the chromoly steel frame and fabricating sheet metal parts. 
 Frank Milburn, Chief Machinist, had 50 years experience.
 Jim True was the first member of the team and an experienced land-speed racer.
 Greg Akatiff, Electronics, is Mike Akatiff's youngest son, who handled all of the onboard video, cockpit recording, and engine management system.

Riders 
 Rocky Robinson (2006– ) was the rider for each of the record-breaking runs, on September 3, 2006, September 26, 2008, and September 25, 2010. 
 Sam Wheeler (2006, Lake Gairdner, Australia)  
 John Noonan (2005, Bonneville, Utah)  
 Jimmy Odom (2004–2005)

References

See also
Motorcycle land-speed record
BUB Seven Streamliner

External links 
 Official Ack Attack page

Motorcycles of the United States
Land speed record motorcycles
Feet forwards motorcycles
Streamliner motorcycles